Henry Holmes (7 November 1839  9 December 1905) was a British violinist, composer, and music educator. His compositional output includes a violin concerto, several works for solo violin, four symphonies, a concert overture, two sacred cantatas for solo voices, chorus, and orchestra, and other chamber and choral works.

Biography
Born in London, Holmes was the younger brother of violinist and composer Alfred Holmes. Both men studied the violin initially with their father and then at the Spohr's Violin School. The brothers made their professional debut together when Henry was just eight years old, performing in concert as duettists at the Haymarket Theatre on 13 July 1847. They then toured throughout Europe to much acclaim and violinist/composer Louis Spohr dedicated his three violin duos to them. The brothers parted ways in 1864, with Alfred settling in Paris and Henry remaining in London.

In London, Holmes was active as a recitalist, chamber musician, and concert soloist. He taught the violin privately and at the Royal College of Music spent much of his time composing. Some of his notable pupils include Arnold Dolmetsch, Arthur Elwell Fisher, Jessie Grimson and Kathleen Parlow. He spent the last several years of his life in San Francisco, California, where he died in 1905 at the age of 66.

Critical reception
A critic in Gloucester was not impressed and made the following criticism in 1880:
The event at Gloucester was the daily appearances of Mr Henry Holmes – aesthetic, violinist, and the composer of a very mediocre cantata. The hair of this genius was crimped and his manners had been put in curl-papers. One day he was accompanied by Mrs Holmes, dressed in a tablecloth and a nimbus,

See also
 Son-in-law, English novelist Edgar Jepson

References

External links
 

1839 births
1905 deaths
19th-century English musicians
Academics of the Royal College of Music
British music educators
English composers
English violinists
British male violinists
19th-century British male musicians